Chimera is the 1995 debut album by cellist Erik Friedlander which was released on the Japanese Avant label.

Reception
The JazzTimes review by Nancy Ann Lee stated "Containing highly imaginative, artistic chamber-jazz, Chimera finds these gifted musicians in tight, tonally colorful interactions and crackling solo moments that draw the most from their acoustic instruments. Everyone excels".

Track listing
All compositions by Erik Friedlander except as indicated
 "Alluvium" - 7:59  
 "Turbine #1" - 4:40  
 "Mercy Street" - 8:43  
 "Single Whip" - 9:48  
 "Blind Tiger" - 10:54  
 "Little Niles" (Randy Weston) - 5:57  
 "Chimera" - 5:52  
 "Fekunk" - 8:59

Personnel
Erik Friedlander – cello
Chris Speed - clarinet
Andrew D'Angelo - bass clarinet 
Drew Gress - bass

References 

1995 debut albums
Erik Friedlander albums
Avant Records albums
Albums produced by John Zorn